Draco Supercluster (SCL 114) is a galaxy supercluster in the constellation Draco. It is located at a distance of 300 Mpc h−1 on a side of a void of diameter of about 130 Mpc h−1. The near side of the void is bordered by the Ursa Major supercluster.

The supercluster has 16 members, all with measured redshifts, and is one of the richest superclusters in the region. The members include Abell 1289, Abell 1302, Abell 1322, Abell 1366, Abell 1402, Abell 1406, Abell 1421, Abell 1432, Abell 1446, Abell 1477, Abell 1518, Abell 1559, Abell 1566, Abell 1621, Abell 1646, and Abell 1674.

Gallery

See also
 3C 319

References

Galaxy superclusters
Draco (constellation)